Richard Meredith may refer to:

Richard Meredith (bishop) (died 1597), Church of Ireland bishop
Sir Richard Meredith, 2nd Baronet (died 1679), MP for Kent
Richard C. Meredith (1937–1979), American science fiction author
Richard Meredith (author) (born 1948), British travel writer
Richard Meredith (ice hockey) (born 1932), American ice hockey player 
Richard Meredith (New Zealand politician) (1843–1918), New Zealand politician
Richard Meredith-Hardy (born 1957), British pilot
Richard Edmund Meredith (1855–1916), Irish jurist
Richard Martin Meredith (died 1934), Canadian jurist
Richard Meredith (priest), Dean of Wells 1607–1621